Lakeisha Dawn Patterson,  (born 5 January 1999) is an Australian Paralympic swimmer. She won medals at the 2014 Commonwealth Games and 2015 IPC Swimming World Championships. At the 2016 Rio Paralympics, she won Australia's first gold medal of the Games in a world record time swim in the Women's 400m freestyle S8. At the 2020 Tokyo Paralympics, she won the gold medal in the Women's 400 m Freestyle S9.

Personal
Patterson was born on 5 January 1999 in Wodonga, Victoria. She has early onset Parkinson's disease, epilepsy and cerebral palsy left hemiplegia.  In 2020, she is undertaking a Bachelor of Communication (majoring in Digital Media) at University of Queensland.

She lives at Caboolture, Queensland.

Career
Patterson started swimming at the age of three as part of her rehabilitation to overcome muscle stiffness.  She is classified as an S9 swimmer. She initially trained under Steve Hadler at Southern Cross Swimming Club, Scarborough and Suellyn Fraser at the Bribie Island Aquatic Leisure Centre.

At the 2014 Commonwealth Games in Glasgow, Scotland, she won the bronze medal in the Women's 100 m Freestyle S8. Competing at the 2015 IPC Swimming World Championships in Glasgow, she won a gold medal in the Women's 4 × 100 m Freestyle Relay 34 points, silver medals in the Women's 50 m Freestyle S8 and Women's 4 × 100 m Medley Relay 34 points and bronze medals in the Women's 100 m Freestyle S8 and Women's 400 m Freestyle S8. She finished fifth in the Women's 100m Backstroke S8.

In April 2016, she was selected as part of the national team for the 2016 Summer Paralympics in Rio de Janeiro. She won Australia's first gold medal of the Rio Paralympics in winning the Women's 400m Freestyle S8, she set a new World record, Paralympic record, and Oceania record of 4:40:33, slicing 0.11 seconds of the previous world record time set by her long-time idol, American Jessica Long, who came in second. She was a member of the team that won the gold medal in the Women's 4 × 100 m Freestyle Relay 34 points. Three silver medals were won in the Women's 50 m and 100m Freestyle S8 behind Maddison Elliott and the Women's 4 × 100 m Medley Relay 34 points.

In reflection on competing at Rio 2016, Patterson says "If someone told me one year ago that this is where I'd be I would have said, 'no, this is a joke.'" But after winning her first gold medal against Jessica Long, she states "I knew I had to attack and go out hard and keep fighting for it, and I knew she was right behind me, so I just had to keep going forward."

At the 2019 World Para Swimming Championships in London, she won the gold medal in the Women's 400 m Freestyle S9 and did not medal in three other events.

At the 2020 Tokyo Paralympics, in her only event, she won the gold medal in the Women's 400 m Freestyle S9 with a time of 4:36.68. This repeated her success in Rio but this time she was in the S9 class as she was reclassified as an S9 swimmer, a class for less physically impaired swimmers.

At the 2022 Commonwealth Games, Birmingham, England, she finished 5th in the Women's 200 m individual medley SM10.

In 2015, she was coached by Jan Cameron at the University of the Sunshine Coast Paralympic Training Centre. In early 2016, she moved to coach Harley Connolly.

Recognition
2016 – Queensland Athlete with a Disability Award
2016 – Sporting Wheelies and Disabled Association Senior Female Athlete of the Year.
2017 – Medal of the Order of Australia
2017 – Swimming Australia Mrs. Gina Rinehart Patron Award
2018 - UniSport Australia - Outstanding Performance by an Athlete with a Disability
2019 - Swimming Australia Paralympic Program Swimmer of the Year (joint winner with Tiffany Thomas Kane)
2019 - University of Queensland’s Sportswoman of the Year

References

External links

 
 
 

Female Paralympic swimmers of Australia
Sportswomen from Queensland
Living people
1999 births
Paralympic gold medalists for Australia
Paralympic silver medalists for Australia
Swimmers at the 2016 Summer Paralympics
Swimmers at the 2020 Summer Paralympics
Medalists at the 2016 Summer Paralympics
Medalists at the 2020 Summer Paralympics
S8-classified Paralympic swimmers
Commonwealth Games bronze medallists for Australia
Swimmers at the 2014 Commonwealth Games
Swimmers at the 2018 Commonwealth Games
Swimmers at the 2022 Commonwealth Games
Commonwealth Games medallists in swimming
People from Wodonga
Recipients of the Medal of the Order of Australia
Medalists at the World Para Swimming Championships
Paralympic medalists in swimming
Australian female freestyle swimmers
S9-classified Paralympic swimmers
Medallists at the 2014 Commonwealth Games
Medallists at the 2018 Commonwealth Games